Anastasia Patsiou (born 13 June 1982) is a Greek handball top player with height 175 cm who competed in the 2004 Summer Olympics.

References

1977 births
Living people
Greek female handball players
Olympic handball players of Greece
Handball players at the 2004 Summer Olympics
Mediterranean Games competitors for Greece
Competitors at the 2005 Mediterranean Games
Sportspeople from Kozani